Miķelis Reinis Dancis (10 September 1939 – 29 January 2020) was a Latvian-born Australian basketball player. His brother, George Dancis, was also a basketball player. He represented Australia at the 1964 Summer Olympics. Both Dancis brothers were awarded the Australian Sports Medal on 13 September 2000.

References

1939 births
2020 deaths
Basketball players at the 1964 Summer Olympics
Latvian emigrants to Australia
Olympic basketball players of Australia
Recipients of the Australian Sports Medal
Basketball players from Adelaide
Basketball players from Riga
Latvian World War II refugees